The XCOR EZ-Rocket was a test platform for the XCOR XR-4A3 rocket propulsion system. The airplane was a modified Rutan Long-EZ, with the propeller replaced by first one, then later a pair of pressure-fed regeneratively cooled liquid-fueled rocket engines and an underslung fuel tank. The engines were restartable in flight, and were contained within Kevlar armor shielding. The EZ-Rocket was registered as an experimental aircraft.

Development and history
The first flight took place on July 21, 2001, flown by test pilot Dick Rutan.

On a typical flight, the EZ-Rocket took off on rockets, gained altitude for a minute or so, then switched off the rockets and glided to a dead stick landing.

The vehicle actually flew better during dead stick landings than a standard Long-EZ due to lack of drag from a stationary pusher propeller — the vehicle's aerodynamics were cleaner in spite of its belly tank. It was also lighter due to the lack of a piston engine (the rocket propulsion system was significantly lighter), so enjoyed significantly lower wing loading than a standard Long-EZ.

When XCOR began flying its EZ-Rocket in 2001, the company decided to have it FAA certified as an experimental aircraft, avoiding the additional time required to seek a launch vehicle license from the Office of Commercial Space Transportation (AST). Jeff Greason, a co-founder of XCOR, said on February 10, 2003 if they were starting out at that time they probably would seek an AST license due to the progress made in developing a regulatory regime for suborbitals.

Milestones and records

October 8, 2000 - First firing of an XCOR Aerospace LOX-powered rocket engine.
July 21, 2001 - First flight, flown by Dick Rutan (single-engine configuration).
October 3, 2001 - First flight in twin-engine configuration.
January 24, 2002 - First rocketplane inflight engine relight. Piloted by Mike Melvill.
June 24, 2002 - First touch-and-go of a rocket-powered aircraft (world record).
Jul 11, 2002 - EZ-Rocket flies twice in one day. First same day rocketplane flights since 1945.
July 25, 2002 - EZ-Rocket first Oshkosh flight at the 2002 EAA AirVenture Oshkosh air show. First rocketplane air show flight in the United States.
July 27, 2002 - EZ-Rocket second Oshkosh flight at the 2002 EAA AirVenture Oshkosh air show. Second rocketplane air show flight in the United States.
August 26, 2005 - EZ-Rocket requalification flight after three-year retirement. Piloted by Dick Rutan.
August 29, 2005 - Searfoss qualification flight.
September 1, 2005 - Altitude validation flight to 11,546 feet. Aircraft demonstrated sufficient range to fly from Mojave to California City and back without a relight, a prerequisite for the world record flight.
October 9, 2005 - EZ-Rocket second and third Las Cruces flights, at Countdown to X PRIZE Cup. Third and fourth rocketplane air show flights in the United States.
December 3, 2005 - Set the point-to-point distance record for a ground-launched, rocket-powered aircraft, flying 16 km from Mojave to California City in just under ten minutes, piloted by Dick Rutan. Also first official delivery of U.S. Mail by a rocket-powered aircraft. In recognition of this achievement, the FAI awarded Rutan the 2005 Louis Blériot Medal.
December 15, 2005 - First cross-country return flight of a rocket-powered aircraft in the United States, return flight from California City, piloted by Rick Searfoss.

Derivatives
The Rocket Racing League aircraft currently in development, the Mark-III X-racer, is a design descendant of the EZ-Rocket aircraft.  Although XCOR is not the developer of the rocket engine for the Mark-III, XCOR did develop the rocket engine for the Mark-I X-Racer, the first of the X-Racers to use a single rocket engine on a Velocity SE basic airframe, and the first X-Racer to utilize kerosene instead of isopropyl alcohol fuel.  XCOR used both design and operational experience from the EZ-Rocket in the Mark-I rocket aircraft design.

Specifications

 Two XR-4A3  thrust rocket engines (non throttleable, restartable in flight)
 20 sec 500 m takeoff roll
 Vne = 
 climb rate = 52 m/s (10,000 ft/min)
 maximum altitude =  MSL
 Fuel: isopropyl alcohol and liquid oxygen
 Chamber pressure: ~ 
 Specific impulse:   to 
 Noise: 128 dB at 10 meters

See also
 Messerschmitt Me 163 Komet

References

External links

 The EZ-Rocket (XCOR)
 howstuffworks: How the EZ-Rocket Works
 Rocket Racing League
 XCOR First Flights from Mojave Virtual Museum

Mojave Air and Space Port
Rocket-powered aircraft
Aviation records
Private spaceflight
2000s United States experimental aircraft
Pressure-fed rockets
Aircraft first flown in 2001
EZ-Rocket